Kris Vriend née Hodgins (born 23 June 1972) is a retired Paralympic athlete from Canada competing mainly in category F35 discus throw events.

Kris competed in the discus in the 1996 Summer Paralympics winning the bronze medal. She competed in the shot put and discus at the 2000, 2004 and 2008 Summer Paralympics but she failed to win another medal. As well as competing at the Paralympics, she is also a two-time World champion in shot put including three World silver medals in the discus and javelin throw.

References

1972 births
Living people
Athletes from Edmonton
Paralympic track and field athletes of Canada
Athletes (track and field) at the 1996 Summer Paralympics
Athletes (track and field) at the 2000 Summer Paralympics
Athletes (track and field) at the 2004 Summer Paralympics
Athletes (track and field) at the 2008 Summer Paralympics
Medalists at the 1996 Summer Paralympics
Paralympic bronze medalists for Canada
Medalists at the 2007 Parapan American Games
Medalists at the World Para Athletics Championships
Paralympic medalists in athletics (track and field)
Canadian female discus throwers
Canadian female javelin throwers
Canadian female shot putters
20th-century Canadian women
21st-century Canadian women